Park Hyung-Joo (also Park Hyeong-Ju, ; born July 16, 1995 in Seoul) is a South Korean swimmer, who specialized in backstroke events. Park qualified for the men's 200 m backstroke, as South Korea's youngest male swimmer (aged 17), at the 2012 Summer Olympics in London, by clearing a FINA B-standard entry time of 2:00.53 from the Dong-A Swimming Tournament in Ulsan. He challenged seven other swimmers on the second heat, including three-time Olympian and European short course champion Aschwin Wildeboer Faber of Spain. Park edged out Ukraine's Oleksandr Isakov to take the seventh spot by 0.28 of a second in 2:01.50. Park failed to advance into the semifinals, as he placed thirty-first overall in the preliminary heats.

References

External links
NBC Olympics Profile

1995 births
Living people
South Korean male backstroke swimmers
Olympic swimmers of South Korea
Swimmers at the 2012 Summer Olympics
Swimmers from Seoul
21st-century South Korean people